Xuanhe Huapu (宣和畫譜, "The Xuanhe Catalogue of Paintings") is an 1120 Chinese palace catalog from the Song dynasty, which in 20 chapters categorized and described ~6396 paintings by 231 artists in the collection of Emperor Huizong of Song. "Xuanhe" (1119–1125) is an era name used by Emperor Huizong. The book is one of the most important sources about 11th/12th-century Chinese art, even if most paintings it described are no longer extant. (Emperor Huizong, a talented painter/connoisseur but inept ruler, was captured by the invading Jin dynasty army in 1127, and his collection was thus lost.)

Contents
The catalog contains 20 chapters, divided into categories:

Biographies of artists are arranged under the category for which he was most famous, which are typically accompanied with a critical evaluation of his style.

References

1120s books
Song dynasty art
Song dynasty literature
12th-century Chinese books